The Hospital is a 1971 American satirical film directed by Arthur Hiller and starring George C. Scott as Dr. Herbert Bock. It was written by Paddy Chayefsky, who was awarded the 1972 Academy Award for Best Original Screenplay.  Chayefsky also narrates the film and was one of the producers; he had complete control over the casting and content of the film.

Plot
At a Manhattan teaching hospital, the life of Dr. Bock, the Chief of Medicine, is in disarray: he has left his wife, his children don't talk to him, and his once-beloved teaching hospital is falling apart.

The hospital is dealing with the sudden deaths of two doctors and a nurse. These are attributed to coincidental or unavoidable failures to provide accurate treatment.

At the same time, administrators must deal with a protest against the hospital's annexation of an adjacent and decrepit apartment building. The annexation is to be used for a drug rehabilitation center; the building's current occupants demand that the hospital find them replacement housing before the building is demolished despite the building being condemned sometime before.

Dr. Bock admits to impotence and has thoughts of suicide, but falls in love with Barbara Drummond, a patient's daughter who came with her father from Mexico for his treatment. This temporarily gives Dr. Bock something to live for, after Barbara challenges and engages with him.

The deaths are discovered to have been caused by Barbara's father as retribution for the "inhumanity" of modern medical treatment. Drummond takes no personal responsibility, claiming his victims would have been saved if they had received prompt, appropriate treatment, but they did not. Dr. Bock and Barbara use a final, accidental death of a doctor at the hospital to cover Drummond's misdeeds.  Barbara makes plans to fly with her father back to Mexico. Dr. Bock at first intends to go with them, but at the last minute, driven by his sense of obligation, he insists on staying behind at the hospital so that it will not descend into total chaos.

Cast
 George C. Scott as Dr. Herbert "Herb" Bock
 Diana Rigg as Miss Barbara Drummond
 Robert Walden as Dr. Brubaker
 Barnard Hughes as Edward Drummond (credited) and Dr. Mallory (uncredited)
 Richard A. Dysart as Dr. Welbeck
 Stephen Elliott as Dr. John Sundstrom
 Andrew Duncan as William "Willie" Mead
 Donald Harron as Milton Mead
 Nancy Marchand as Mrs. Christie, Head of Nurses
 Jordan Charney as Hitchcock, Hospital Administration
 Roberts Blossom as Guernsey
 Lenny Baker as Dr. Howard Schaefer
 Richard Hamilton as Dr. Ronald Casey
 Arthur Junaluska as Mr. Blacktree
 Kate Harrington as Nurse Dunne
 Katherine Helmond as Mrs. Marilyn Mead
 David Hooks as Dr. Joe Einhorn
 Frances Sternhagen as Mrs. Sally Cushing
 Stockard Channing as E.R. Nurse (uncredited)
 Dennis Dugan as E.R. Doctor (uncredited)

Production 
It was filmed at Metropolitan Hospital Center in New York. Frank Thompson designed the costumes for the film.

Reception

Box office
The film earned $9 million in North American rentals.

Critical response
When the film was released, film critic Roger Ebert lauded the film, writing, "The Hospital is a better movie than you may have been led to believe. It has been criticized for switching tone in midstream, but maybe it's only heading for deeper, swifter waters. [...] Chayevsky's [sic] bizarre and unexpected ending suggests that men - even madmen - can still use institutions for their own private purpose."

The New York Times found the film “a very serious (in fact, perhaps, a little too serious), very funny melodramatic farce....[it] is not, as you might be led to believe, the sort of pious, inside-institution literature that Arthur Hailey grinds out to satisfy the book clubs, if not the muses, nor is it really one of those malpractice horror stores that are so helpful in obtaining lecture tours for medical men....the writer’s intelligence, and his only recently exercised gift for fantasy...save ‘The Hospital’ from a couple of serious seizures that, toward the end, overtake the movie when it feels called upon to certify its serious purposes and to straighten out its peculiar plot....Mr. Hiller....obtains excellent performances from his stars [and] has perfectly cast the film down to roles that are so small they depend—I suspect—as much on natural mannerism as on acting talent.”

More recently, film critic Dennis Schwartz gave the film a mildly positive review, writing, "The gallows humor was the melodramatic farce's saving grace; the film uses its razor-sharp instruments to cut into the hides of the insensitive institutionalized health care providers like Michael Moore's Sicko does in 2007 to the fat-cat HMOs. My major gripe was that it could have been better, as Chayefsky delivered his part of the bargain and so did Scott; nevertheless the pic flattens out as the director increasingly loses his way in all the bitterness and invented horror stories and leaves us dangling over how to get out of such an irredeemable world (where modern man is perceived as forgotten in death)." The film has a 100% rating on Rotten Tomatoes, with an average rating of 7.8/10, based on 12 reviews.

Awards and nominations

In 1995, The Hospital was selected for preservation in the United States National Film Registry as being deemed "culturally, historically, or aesthetically significant".

See also
 List of American films of 1971

Notes

References

External links

 
 
 
 The Hospital essay by Daniel Eagan in America's Film Legacy: The Authoritative Guide to the Landmark Movies in the National Film Registry, A&C Black, 2010 , pages 676-677 

1971 films
1970s black comedy films
1971 comedy-drama films
American black comedy films
American comedy-drama films
American satirical films
Films about medical malpractice
Films directed by Arthur Hiller
Films set in New York City
Films whose writer won the Best Original Screenplay Academy Award
Films whose writer won the Best Screenplay BAFTA Award
Films set in hospitals
Films with screenplays by Paddy Chayefsky
Silver Bear Grand Jury Prize winners
United Artists films
United States National Film Registry films
1970s English-language films
1970s American films